Sven Schmitt (born December 27, 1976) is a German former footballer. He made his debut on the professional league level in the 2. Bundesliga for Eintracht Frankfurt on September 15, 1996 when he started in a game against SpVgg Unterhaching.

References

1976 births
Living people
German footballers
Eintracht Frankfurt players
Eintracht Frankfurt II players
SV Darmstadt 98 players
Viktoria Aschaffenburg players
Bundesliga players
2. Bundesliga players

Association football goalkeepers